Albert Park is located in Suva, the capital of Fiji. It was named after Prince Albert, the Consort of Queen Victoria of Great Britain, to whom the country was ceded to in 1874.

Albert Park can hold two rugby matches at one time. There is also a hockey pitch located in the middle of the ground with a grandstand and a cafeteria. The annual hibiscus festival is also held there.

The park was the site of a landing by the Australian aviator Sir Charles Kingsford Smith during the first trans-Pacific flight from the United States to Australia in 1928. It was also the site of the first hoisting of the new national flag of Fiji on 9 October 1970.

Cricket ground 
In August 2018, it was named as the host venue for the matches in Group A of the 2018–19 ICC World Twenty20 East Asia-Pacific Qualifier tournament.

References

Football venues in Fiji
Rugby league stadiums in Fiji
Rugby union stadiums in Fiji
Suva